Trapped is a six-episode documentary television series that premiered on November 7, 2007 on the National Geographic Channel. Produced in association with the  Canadian National Geographic Channel and Cineflix (which produced Mayday, also known as Air Crash Investigation), the program examined various actual incidents or disasters in which victims were trapped on the site.

Episodes
{{Episode table |background=#000 |total_width=70 |overall= |title= |aux1= |aux1T=Situation |aux2= |aux2T=Situation duration |aux3= |aux3T= Nature of Situation |airdate= |episodes=

{{Episode list
| EpisodeNumber = 2
| Title = Ocean Emergency
| Aux1 = RORO vessel Camilla
| Aux2 = January 23, 2003
| Aux3 = Disabled ship
| OriginalAirDate = 
| ShortSummary = The Camilla, a Finnish roll-on/roll-off cargo ship in Canadian waters, suffers a main engine failure. With a storm approaching, the captain declares an emergency to the Canadian Coast Guard. A squad of Canadian Armed Forces rescuers from 103 Search and Rescue Squadron fly to the ship and the sixteen members of the Camilla'''s crew are safely evacuated. 
| LineColor = 000
}}

}}

References

See alsoBlueprint for DisasterMayday: Air Crash InvestigationSeconds from DisasterSeismic SecondsSituation Critical''

National Geographic (American TV channel) original programming
2000s American documentary television series
2007 American television series debuts
2007 Canadian television series debuts
2000s Canadian documentary television series